Tandava Krishnudu is a 1984 Telugu-language drama film, produced by B. Gopala Reddy under the Krishna Art Creations banner and directed by P. Chandrasekhara Reddy. It stars Akkineni Nageswara Rao, Jaya Prada  and music composed by Chakravarthy.

Plot
The film begins with a millionaire (Mikkilineni) who leads a happy life with his son Ananda Rao and daughter Rajyalakshmi (Annapurna). Rajyalakshmi marries a pleb, Bhanu Murthy (Satyanarayana) who is malicious and defrauds a huge amount from the company along with his brother Ramachandra Murthy (Allu Ramalingaiah). Dhananjay Rao (Kanta Rao) the trustworthy employee of Ananda Rao detects it. So, they slaughter Ananda Rao and indict Dhananjay Rao in the crime with the help of their henchman Gurrala Gurunatham (Gollapudi Maruti Rao). Rajyalakshmi learns it, but Bhanu Murthy ploys. by declaring her insane and sealed in the mental hospital. Due to the humiliations, Dhananjay Rao's wife Parvathi (Athili Lakshmi) leaves the city with her two children. Years roll by, and Vani (Jaya Prada), daughter of Ananda Rao, the only heir of the property guarded by Bhanu Murthy & Ramachandra Murthy. Here, they intrigue to couple her with one of their sons Seshagiri (Giri Babu) & Raja (Rajendra Prasad) respectively. Seshagiri is a scoundrel, whereas Raja is a good egg, he falls for Gurunatham's daughter Rani (Shyamala Gowri). Meanwhile, Chakravarthy (Akkineni Nageswara Rao) a simpleton, is a newly appointed lecturer in Vani's college. Vani likes his ideologies and marries him. Soon after the wedding, as a surprise, it is revealed that Chakravarthy is the son of Dhananjay Rao who made a play to seize the real culprits. Moreover, his sister Seeta (Mucherla Aruna) has been deceived by Seshagiri. Right now, Chakravarthy starts teasing the blackguards, gets back Rajyalakshmi, and recruits Seeta as her caretaker. Thereafter, Bhanu Murthy & Ramachandra Murthy discovers the true identity of Chakravarthy and again manipulate it by creating turbulence between Chakravarthy & Vani. At last, Chakravarthy ceases them with the help of Raja & Rani, proves his father's innocence, and reforms Seshagiri. Finally, the movie ends on a happy note with the reunion of the entire family.

Cast

Akkineni Nageswara Rao as Chakravarthy
Jaya Prada as Vani
Satyanarayana as Bhanu Murthy
Allu Ramalingaiah as Ramachandra Murthy
Kanta Rao as Dhananjay Rao
Gollapudi Maruti Rao as Gurrala Gurunatham
Giri Babu as Seshagiri
Rajendra Prasad as Raja
Mikkilineni as Vani's grandfather 
Vankayala Satyanarayana as Doctor
Ch. Krishna Murthy
Nalinikanth as Varma
Jaya Prakash Reddy as Principal
Annapurna as Rajyalakshmi 
Mucherla Aruna as Seeta
Athili Lakshmi as Parvathi
Shyamala Gowri as Rani

Crew
Art: B. Chalam
Choreography: Seenu
Stills: Mohanji-Jaganji
Fights: S. Sambasiva Rao
Dialogues: Paruchuri Brothers
Lyrics: Veturi
Playback: S. P. Balasubrahmanyam, S. Janaki, P. Susheela S. P. Sailaja
Music: Chakravarthy
Story: D. R. Chenna Reddy
Editing: V. Ankki Reddy
Cinematography: V. S. R. Swamy
Producer: B. Gopala Reddy
Screenplay - Director: P. Chandrasekhara Reddy
Banner: Krishna Art Creations
Release Date: 18 January 1984

Soundtrack

Music composed by Chakravarthy. Lyrics were written by Veturi.

Other
 VCDs and DVDs on - Universal Videos, SHALIMAR Video Company, Hyderabad

References

1980s Telugu-language films
Films scored by K. Chakravarthy
Indian drama films
1984 drama films
1984 films
Films directed by P. Chandrasekhara Reddy